This is a list of geographical features in the state of Schleswig-Holstein, Germany.

Rivers

Islands

Miscellaneous

Cities 

Places
Schleswig-Holstein